Heavenly In-Laws is a TVB drama series released overseas in January 2007 and aired on TVB Pay Vision Channel in July 2007.

Cast

External links
TVB.com  Heavenly In-Laws - Official Website 
SPCNET.tv Heavenly In-Laws - Reviews 

TVB dramas
2007 Hong Kong television series debuts
2007 Hong Kong television series endings